Helen Reid may refer to:
 Helen Rogers Reid, American newspaper publisher
 Helen Richmond Young Reid, Canadian social reformer